Closer is the fifth studio album by the New Orleans-based rock trio Better Than Ezra.  It was released on August 7, 2001 by Beyond Records.  Closer initially performed better than its predecessor, How Does Your Garden Grow?, peaking at #110 on the Billboard charts. The first single off the album, "Extra Ordinary," placed on both the Billboard Modern Rock and Adult Top 40 charts (it was the eighth and last BTE single to date to place on the Modern Rock charts). A second single, "Misunderstood," was planned, but Beyond Records declared bankruptcy before it could be released.

As of early 2007, Closer was out of print due to Beyond Records going out of business and copies were scarce, though some were still in stock in stores.  Legal problems resulting from Beyond's bankruptcy meant it would be four years before Better than Ezra's next studio album, Before the Robots. In the meantime, the band would release a live album in 2004, recorded in their hometown at the House of Blues.

In June 2009, the band announced they had acquired the rights to "Closer" and all of the master tracks recorded during the sessions for the album, and would be reissuing it via their own label on CD, The re-release was made available in October 2009 via the band's online store, sporting a bright new red cover, and two bonus tracks, "Simple Song", a long-standing fan favorite, and "Screwed Up And Beautiful". Both tracks were recorded during the 2001 sessions for the album but omitted from the final record.

Track listing
All tracks by Kevin Griffin

"Misunderstood" – 3:46
"Extra Ordinary" (featuring DJ Swamp) – 3:37
"Closer" – 4:31
"Rolling" (featuring Toddy Walters) – 3:31
"A Lifetime" – 3:36
"Recognize" (featuring DJ Swamp) – 3:18
"Sincerely, Me" – 3:53
"Get You In" – 4:07
"Briefly" – 4:19
"Juarez" – 4:26
"I Do" – 3:44

2009 reissue
"Screwed Up and Beautiful" – 3:09
"Simple Song" – 4:41

Personnel
 Kevin Griffin – Guitar, Piano, Vocals
 Tom Drummond – Bass
 Travis McNabb – Drums

Additional personnel
 Tim Palmer - Mixing
 Mark Mullins – Trombone
 Eric Lucero – Trumpet
 David Campbell String Arrangements
 James Arthur Payne – Guitar
 Toddy Walters – Backing Vocals
 DJ Swamp – turntables
 DJ Wolf (Chick Wolverton) – keyboards, turntables
 Michael Goods – Rhodes, Organ

Quartet Illumina
 Guenevere Measham – Cello
 Leah Katz – Viola
 Daphne Chen – Violin
 Melissa Reiner – Violin

References 

2001 albums
Better Than Ezra albums
Albums produced by Brad Wood